Eric Veach is a Canadian computer scientist who won two technical Academy Awards.

He won his 2014 Academy Award for "foundational research on efficient Monte Carlo path tracing for image synthesis", as applied to computer graphics, described in his 1997 PhD thesis.  He told CTV News he hadn't done any work in computer graphics for 15 years.  Veach had worked at Pixar, and more recently he had been a senior developer at Google.

His PhD thesis, Robust Monte Carlo Methods for Light Transport Simulation, is highly cited.

In 2008 the University of Waterloo, the institution where he earned his Bachelor of Mathematics in 1990, awarded him a J. W. Graham Medal, an annual award granted to a distinguished alumnus who had studied computer science there.
His PhD is from Stanford University.

Veach is a strong believer in environmental causes and serves as the chair of the Rainforest Trust board.

Farhad Manjoo named Veach and two of his non-American colleagues, at Google, in an article entitled, "Why Silicon Valley Wouldn't Work Without Immigrants".  Manjoo's article attempted to explain why newly inaugurated President Donald Trump's attempts to squeeze off the flow of immigrants to the US was dangerous.  He argued that America disproportionately benefits from allowing intellectual foreigners like Veach to find work.

Veach is the primary developer of Google's S2 geometry for geohashing.

References

External links

Living people
Year of birth missing (living people)
Canadian computer scientists